Darreh-ye Badam is a village in Lorestan Province, Iran.

Darreh-ye Badam or Darreh Badam may refer to:
 Darreh Badam-e Olya
 Darreh Badam-e Sofla (disambiguation)